The Men's 2003 European Union Amateur Boxing Championships were held in Strasbourg, France from June 10 to June 14. The 1st ever edition of the annual competition was organised by the European governing body for amateur boxing, EABA.

Medal winners

External links
EABA Boxing

References

European Union Amateur Boxing Championships
European Union Amateur Boxing Championships
European Union Amateur Boxing Championships
2003 European Union Amateur Boxing Championships
European Union Amateur Boxing Championships
International boxing competitions hosted by France